Pectinimura baryoma is a moth in the family Lecithoceridae. It is found in Papua New Guinea.

The length of the forewing is about 7 mm. The forewing colour pattern is similar to that of Pectinimura lutescens, but it is much smaller, with inconspicuous discal stigmata.

References

Moths described in 1954
baryoma